Prachi Garg ( Hindi Devanagari Script: प्राची गर्ग; born 19 May 1984) is an Indian author columnist, academe speaker, traveler and entrepreneur. Her books "Superwomen", focused on women entrepreneurship and "Supercouples" based on the entrepreneurship endeavors and challenges by couples.  Much of her subject or theme is oriented towards entrepreneurship, social issues and development and women empowerment in the context of Indian subcontinent. She combines dreams with realism with facts derived from the practical life.

Early life, family background and education 
Prachi Garg was born on 19 May 1984 in Bulandshahr, Uttar Pradesh, in a business family. She is a daughter of Neeru Garg and Brajesh Garg. She has completed her bachelor and master in computer science from the University of Delhi. She has earned a master degree in business administration (MBA) from Great Lakes Institute of Management, Chennai.

Career and entrepreneurship 
She has worked as an anchor and news reporter with DD News Journal, freelance journalist with EET India, and has been freelancing for HT Horizons. She is an author.

She owns an enterprise Ghoomophiro. Her start-up has been covered by, Indian Express Femina, iDiva. She does trekking and organizes women guided tours.

Writing career 

Superwomen. The book, a collection of biographies, narrates the entrepreneurial journeys and struggles therein of 20 women from the Indian subcontinent. It depicts how these women played all their roles to perfection, aligning their families with their ambitions, showing the world their true mettle
Supercouples. The book, a collection of biographies.
Supersiblings. Her latest book focuses on siblings who've established themselves as entrepreneurs together and how their relationship has nurtured during that course.
"Legends of the startup guy". The book was launched in March and is about how a young guy Ganesh starts his business. It is a mix of Indian mythology and business lessons. 
"Startup Secrets from the Ramayana". The book that has startup lessons from Ramayana.

Awards
 Received the "ET inspiring leader award for technology and entrepreneurial literature" 2021 by Economic Times

 Received the "Women Disruptor of the year for the excellence in Technology

 Received the "Indian Prime Women Icon Award - 2022

Bibliography

References

Women writers from Uttar Pradesh
21st-century Indian women writers
Indian women novelists
21st-century Indian non-fiction writers
Indian business writers
1984 births
Indian women columnists
Living people